Following is a glossary of stock market terms.

All or none or AON: in investment banking or securities transactions, "an order to buy or sell a stock that must be executed in its entirely, or not executed at all".
Ask price or Ask: the lowest price a seller of a stock is willing to accept for a share of that given stock.
Bear market: a general decline in the stock market over a period of time. See Market trend.
Bookrunner: in investment banking, usually the main underwriter or lead-manager/arranger/coordinator in equity, debt, or hybrid securities issuances.
Bull market: a period of generally rising prices. See Market trend.
Closing print: a report of the final prices for the day on a stock exchange.
Fill or kill or FOK: "an order to buy or sell a stock that must be executed immediately"—a few seconds, customarily—in its entirety; otherwise, the entire order is cancelled; no partial fulfillments are allowed.
Green sheet: a document that accompanies a prospectus for most initial public offerings, and describes the basic terms of the offering that are of the most important to a registered representative.
Greenshoe: A special arrangement in a share offering, for example an IPO, which enables the investment bank representing the underwriters to support the share price after the offering without putting their own capital at risk.
Reverse greenshoe: a special provision in an IPO prospectus, which allows underwriters to sell shares back to the issuer.
Immediate or cancel, IOC, or accept order: "an order to buy or sell a stock that must be executed immediately"; if the entire order is not available at that moment for purchase a partial fulfillment is possible, but any portion of an IOC order that cannot be filled immediately is cancelled, eliminating the need for manual cancellation.
Initial public offering or IPO: a type of public offering in which shares of a company are sold to institutional investors.
Institutional investor: an entity which pools money to purchase securities, real property, and other investment assets or originate loans.
Market top: the highest point of trading before the market shifts from a bull market to a bear market.
Market trend: the tendency of financial markets to move in a particular direction over time.
Public float or Free float: the portion of shares of a corporation that are in the hands of public investors as opposed to locked-in stock held by promoters, company officers, controlling-interest investors, or government.
Pump and dump or P&D: a form of securities fraud  that involves artificially inflating the price of an owned stock through false and misleading positive statements, in order to sell the cheaply purchased stock at a higher price.
Runoff or run-off: the period at the end of a stock market trading session originally reserved for printing end-of-trading share prices and values onto ticker tape; now used to describe trades at the end of a session that may not be announced or reported until the start of the next session.
Stub: the stock representing the remaining equity in a corporation left over after a major cash or security distribution from a buyout, a spin-out, a demerger or some other form of restructuring removes most of the company's operations from the parent corporation.
Theoretical ex-rights price: a situation where the stock and the right attached to the stock is separated.
Trade: the buying and selling of financial instruments.
Two-tier tender offer: an offer to purchase a sufficient number of stockholders' shares so as to gain effective control of a firm at a certain price per share, followed by a lower offer at a later date for the remaining shares.
Variable prepaid forward contract: an investment strategy that allows a shareholder with a concentrated stock holding to generate liquidity for diversification or other purposes.
Widow-and-orphan stock: a stock that reliably provides a regular dividend while also yielding a slow but steady rise in market value over the long term.
Witching hour: the last hour of stock trading between 3 pm (when the bond market closes) and 4 pm EST (when the stock market closes), which can be characterized by higher-than-average volatility.
 Triple witching hour: the last hour of the stock market trading session (3:00-4:00 P.M., New York City local Time) on the third Friday of every March, June, September, and December, when three kinds of securities expire - stock market index futures, stock market index options, and stock options.
Yellow strip price or Touch price: in the UK stock market (LSE), the highest bid price or lowest offer price, shown on the SEAQ or SETS screen in a yellow strip.

References

Stock Market
Stock market
Wikipedia glossaries using unordered lists